Events from the year 1760 in France

Incumbents
 Monarch – Louis XV

Events
14 July – Battle of Emsdorf
31 July – Battle of Warburg
15 October – Battle of Kloster Kampen
Claimed – Foundation of Lombart Chocolate company

Births

10 January – Guillaume Guillon-Lethière, painter (died 1832)
5 February –  Charlotte de Robespierre (died 1834)
2 March – Camille Desmoulins, journalist and politician during the French Revolution (executed 1794)
30 September – Madame de Saint-Laurent (died 1830)
6 October – Victoire Babois, poet and writer of elegies (died 1839)
20 October – Alexandre-Théodore-Victor, comte de Lameth, soldier and politician (died 1829)

Deaths
3 April – Jacob B. Winslow, anatomist (born 1669)
11 April – Louis de Silvestre, painter (born 1675)
10 June – Louis-Gui de Guérapin de Vauréal, ecclesiastic and diplomat (born 1688)
13 September – Guy Auguste de Rohan-Chabot, nobleman (born 1683)
14 November – François Colin de Blamont, violinist and composer (born 1690)

Full date missing
Pierre-Alexandre Aveline, engraver, portraitist, illustrator and printmaker (born 1702)
François Bouvard, composer (born c.1684)
Claude Moët, wine merchant (born 1683)

See also

References

1760s in France